Limnaecia phaeopleura is a moth in the family Cosmopterigidae. It is found on Fiji.

References

Natural History Museum Lepidoptera generic names catalog

Limnaecia
Moths described in 1924
Taxa named by Edward Meyrick
Moths of Fiji